Papilio longimacula, is a species of butterfly in the family Papilionidae. It is found in China.

References
 Wang, Z.-G. & Y. Niu, 2002: New species of butterflies (Lepidoptera) from China, II. Entomotaxonomia 2002 (4): 276-284.

longimacula
Butterflies described in 2002